Romeo and Juliet is a filmed performance of the 2013 Broadway theatrical production of William Shakespeare's Romeo and Juliet starring Orlando Bloom and Condola Rashād which was produced as a 2014 film by BroadwayHD and Fathom Events.

Plot
Classic retelling of Romeo and Juliet storyline with Shakespeare play dialogue.  However the play is set in modern-day with Romeo arriving on stage riding a motorcycle in blue jeans and sunglasses. The Montague family is all white and the Capulet family all black adding a new dimension of racial conflict between the two families.
Balcony scene remains unchanged and the ending is still a tragedy that unites the families.

Cast
Orlando Bloom – Romeo
Condola Rashād – Juliet
Brent Carver – Friar Laurence
Jayne Houdyshell – Nurse
Donté Bonner – Sampson
Christian Camargo – Mercutio
Joe Carroll – Balthasar
Chuck Cooper – Lord Capulet
 Corey Hawkins – Tybalt
Geoffrey Owens - Prince Escalus

Production background
It was the first Broadway production of the play Romeo and Juliet since 1977. The play ran on Broadway at Richard Rodgers Theatre from September 19 to December 8, 2013, for 93 regular performances after 27 previews starting on August 24 with Orlando Bloom and Condola Rashād in the starring roles. On November 27, two performances of the production were filmed with nine cameras in high definition, and these performances were scheduled to be released in 2000 theatres on February 13 for the Valentine's Day week in 2014 in the United States. The United Kingdom theatrical release date was April 1.

This production depicts Romeo and his Montague family with white actors, while Juliet and her Capulet family are depicted with black actors. The production was a modernization featuring a Triumph motorcycle and zip-up jackets. The show marked Bloom's Broadway debut, and although Rashad had earned Tony Award nominations for both of her two prior Broadway roles, it was the first professional Shakespeare production for both stars. Therefore, the actors hired Patsy Rodenburg of Guildhall School of Music and Drama as a Shakespearean voice instructor.

Critical response
The play was met with modest reviews. Broadwayworld.com critic, Michael Dale, viewed the work as "lacking" in many respects. Despite the fact that Director David Leveaux uses a grand entrance for star Bloom on a motorcycle, the show is mostly "stale" according to Terry Teachout of The Wall Street Journal. The Hollywood Reporter David Rooney described the production as "snoozy". Nonetheless, the film received a fresh rating from 5 out of 6 reviewers at Rotten Tomatoes.

Notes

External links
 
 
 
 

2010s English-language films
Films based on Romeo and Juliet
2014 romantic drama films
2014 films
Stage productions of plays by William Shakespeare
Filmed stage productions
Films about interracial romance